Repiping means replacing the pipes in a building, oil or gas well, or centrifuge.

References

See also
Plumbing

Piping